The South Australian Railways 600 class was a class of 4-6-2 steam locomotives operated by the South Australian Railways.

History
The 600 class were part of larger order for 30 steam locomotives placed with Armstrong Whitworth, England in 1924, as part of the rehabilitation of the state's rail system, overseen by railways commissioner William Webb. The 600 class design was based on the USRA Light Pacific, although modifications were made by SAR's Chief Mechanical Engineer, Fred Shea, to allow them to fit South Australia's tighter loading gauge. They arrived in Adelaide in 1926.

609 was named Duke of Gloucester after hauling the Duke's Royal Train in 1934 and so became Australia's first "royal" engine.

The entire class received upgraded boilers and front ends from the late 1930s onwards, and was reclassified as the 600C class. They were also fitted with large smoke deflectors over their lifetime. Ten locomotives of the South Australian Railways 620 class were built at Islington Railway Workshops in 1936–1938, to a similar design.

All examples of the 600 class were withdrawn between 1955 and 1961. None were preserved.

Class list

References

External links

Armstrong Whitworth locomotives
Railway locomotives introduced in 1925
600
4-6-2 locomotives
Broad gauge locomotives in Australia
Scrapped locomotives
Passenger locomotives